Darío Alberto Gigena (born 21 January 1978) is a former Argentine football striker.

Gigena played for several clubs in the Primera División Argentina and in the lower leagues of Argentine football.

Gigena also spent much of his career playing outside Argentina for Rayo Vallecano of Spain, Ponte Preta of Brazil, Cortuluá, Deportivo Pereira and Once Caldas of Colombia, Guaros FC of Venezuela, Everton of Chile, LDU Portoviejo of Ecuador and Universitario de Deportes of Peru.

Honours

Club
Talleres
Copa Conmebol (1): 1999

Everton
Primera División de Chile (1): 2008 Apertura

External links
 Argentine Primera statistics
 BDFA profile

1978 births
Living people
Argentine footballers
Argentine expatriate footballers
Argentine Primera División players
Categoría Primera A players
Chilean Primera División players
Segunda División players
Peruvian Primera División players
Nueva Chicago footballers
San Telmo footballers
Club Universitario de Deportes footballers
Rayo Vallecano players
Club Atlético Colón footballers
Associação Atlética Ponte Preta players
Deportivo Pereira footballers
Once Caldas footballers
Cortuluá footballers
Everton de Viña del Mar footballers
L.D.U. Portoviejo footballers
Club Almagro players
Expatriate footballers in Spain
Expatriate footballers in Brazil
Expatriate footballers in Peru
Expatriate footballers in Chile
Expatriate footballers in Colombia
Expatriate footballers in Ecuador
Expatriate footballers in Venezuela
Argentine expatriate sportspeople in Brazil
Argentine expatriate sportspeople in Spain
Association football forwards
Guaros F.C. players
Sportspeople from Córdoba Province, Argentina